Emam (also Romanized as Emām and Imam) is a village in Bonab Rural District, in the Central District of Zanjan County, Zanjan Province, Iran. At the 2006 census, its population was 525, in 101 families. This village is actually part of the villages of Tarom region.

References 

Populated places in Zanjan County